Vittorio Gregotti (10 August 1927 – 15 March 2020) was an Italian architect, born in Novara. He was seen as both a member of the Neo-Avant Garde and a key figure in 1970s Postmodernism.

Biography
Gregotti was born in Novara, in the Italian Piedmont, and attended the Politecnico di Milano. He worked as a contributor to Casabella, an architectural magazine, and was its editor-in-chief from 1955 to 1963. Gregotti founded his own studio, Gregotti Associati International, in 1974 but also lectured on architectural theory and curated several exhibits in Italy.

His studio has designed several important sports venues and cultural buildings, such as the Barcelona Olympic Stadium, the Belém Cultural Center in Lisbon, the Arcimboldi Opera Theater in Milan and several university campuses, including that of the University of Calabria.

His studio also designed Pujiang New Town in Shanghai, China, a new town with an Italian architectural theme.

In 2012, he wrote an article for STUDIO Architecture and Urbanism magazine published on its issue#02 Original, edited by Romolo Calabrese.

Gregotti was a member of the Italian Communist Party.

His 1996 book Inside Architecture was recommended by English architect Alan Colquhoun as having "an unusual honesty and philosophical depth of thought".

Gregotti died of COVID-19 in Milan on 15 March 2020, aged 92.

Books
Inside Architecture, (The MIT Press, 1996) 
Architecture, Means and Ends translated by Lydia Cochrane (University of Chicago Press, 2010)

References

1927 births
2020 deaths
People from Novara
20th-century Italian architects
21st-century Italian architects
Polytechnic University of Milan alumni
Members of the European Academy of Sciences and Arts
Casabella editors
Architects from Milan
Members of the Académie d'architecture
Modernist architects
Deaths from the COVID-19 pandemic in Lombardy
Compasso d'Oro Award recipients